The following lists events that happened during 1927 in Chile.

Incumbents
President of Chile: Emiliano Figueroa (until 10 May), Carlos Ibáñez del Campo

Events

May
22 May – Due to the resignation of President Figueroa, elections are held.  Carlos Ibáñez del Campo wins the election and becomes president.

Births 
14 January – Carlos Camus (d. 2014)
25 February - Humberto Giannini (philosopher)
27 June – Gracia Barrios, Chilean painter (d. 2020)
26 August – Hernán Figueroa
1 September – Arturo Farías (d. 1992)
21 October – Sergio Valech (d. 2010)

Deaths
3 May – David Arellano (b. 1901)

References 

 
Years of the 20th century in Chile
Chile